The 2016 Women's Super 3s, known for sponsorship reasons as the 2016 Toyota Super 3s, was the second Women's Super 3s competition that took place in Ireland. It ran from May to July, with 3 teams taking part made up of the best players in Ireland. The teams played 6 matches each, four 50 over matches and two Twenty20s. Dragons won the competition, winning their first title.

Competition format
The three teams played six matches each in a league system. Each team played the other two sides twice in a 50 over match and once in a Twenty20 match, with all matches contributing to 
a unified table.

The league worked on a points system with positions being based on the total points. Points were awarded as follows:

Win: 2 points. 
Tie: 1 point. 
Loss: 0 points.
Abandoned/No Result: 1 point.

Squads

Source: Cricket Ireland

Points table

Source: CricketArchive

References

Women's Super Series
2016 in Irish cricket